The L-11 76.2 mm tank gun was a Soviet tank gun, used on the earliest models of the T-34 Model 1940 medium tank and KV-1 Model 1939 heavy tank during World War II.

History
The L-11 was designed in 1938 by IA Makhanov of the SKB-4 design bureau at the Kirov Plant in Leningrad.  It was 30.5 calibers long, had a semi-automatic vertical sliding-wedge breech, used fixed quick-fire 76.2 x 385 mm R ammunition and had a hydro-pneumatic recoil mechanism.

It has been claimed that the L-11 was based on the 76 mm air-defense gun M1914/15 designed by VV Tarnovsky and F. F. Lender.  What can be said is that both the M1914/15 and L-11 had similar lengths, similar muzzle velocities (592 m/s vs 613 m/s), were built in the same factory and fired the same ammunition.

Through a combination of administrative interference by Marshal Grigory Kulik and bureaucratic inertia, the first models of the T-34 and KV-1 were both armed with the L-11.  Testing of both tanks highlighted an undesirable situation where both a medium tank and heavy tank were equal in firepower and neither had the firepower necessary to defeat a foreign tank of similar capabilities.  Although an acceptable tank gun by the standards of the time the L-11 did not have a substantial performance advantage over foreign designs.  Therefore, the L-11 was a stopgap until improved guns for the T-34 and KV-1 could be produced.  An early favorite to replace the L-11 was a modified version of the 76 mm air defense gun M1931, but delays and difficulties saw it passed over despite excellent performance.

During 1941 the L-11 was replaced on T-34 production lines by the 42.5 caliber F-34 and on KV-1 production lines by the 31.5 caliber F-32.  Despite being considered a superior design the performance of the F-32 gun was not substantially better than the L-11 and inferior to the F-34 gun used on the T-34.  Eventually, the F-32 gun was replaced on the KV-1 production lines by a modified version of the F-34 gun called the ZiS-5, finally giving the T-34 and KV-1 parity in firepower.

Variants

L-17 casemate gun 

The design bureau of the Kirov Plant under the leadership of IA Makhanov responded by creating a variant of the L-11 which it called the L-17. The L-17 was mounted in a heavily armored gun mantlet with the barrel inside of an armored tube. In May 1939, the Kirov plant received an order for six-hundred L-17 guns. The first L-17's were installed in June 1940 in the Kamenets-Podilsky fortified area.

Field gun conversion 
During 1941-1942 a field gun based on the L-11 was introduced.  It consisted of an L-11 barrel on the split-trail carriage used by the ZiS-3.  This adaptation was probably done to address the huge losses of artillery suffered during the summer of 1941 and to use surplus L-11 barrels.  The Soviet designation for this gun is not known, but the Germans referred to them as the 7.62 cm FK 250(r).

Comparison of guns

Notes

References
 Chamberlain, Peter.  Gander Terry. 1975. Light and medium field artillery. New York: Arco. .
 Zaloga, Steve. 1994. T-34/76 Medium Tank 1941-45. Osprey Publishing. 
 Zaloga, Steve. Grandsen, James. 1984.  Soviet tanks and combat vehicles of World War Two. London: Arms and Armour Press. p225. .

External links
 http://www.armchairgeneral.com/rkkaww2/weapons/art_tanks.htm
 http://tankarchives.blogspot.com/2016/02/minor-modernization-t-150.html
 http://www.plam.ru/tehnauka/genii_sovetskoi_artillerii_triumf_i_tragedija_v_grabina/p15.php

World War II tank guns
World War II artillery of the Soviet Union
Tank guns of the Soviet Union
Military equipment introduced in the 1930s